Sloman is a surname, and may refer to:

 Aaron Sloman, UK academic and artificial intelligence researcher
 Albert Sloman, UK vice chancellor, University of Essex, 1963-1987
 Anthony Sloman, English film critic
 Bob Sloman, English 1920s rugby league footballer
 Charles Sloman, English comic entertainer and songwriter in the mid-19th century
 Edward Sloman, English silent film director and actor
 Henry Brarens Sloman, English-German entrepreneur
 Henry Stanhope Sloman, British Army officer
 John Sloman, Welsh vocalist, with Uriah Heep
 Robert Sloman (1926–2005), English screenwriter and actor
 Robert Miles Sloman, English-German shipbuilder and shipowner
 Roger Sloman, English actor
 Sam Sloman (born 1997), American football player